Mesapamea arbora is a species of cutworm or dart moth in the family Noctuidae first described by William Barnes and James Halliday McDunnough in 1912. It is found in North America.

The MONA or Hodges number for Mesapamea arbora is 9407.

References

Further reading

 
 
 

Noctuinae
Articles created by Qbugbot
Moths described in 1912